XEDA (branded as Imagen Radio) is a Spanish-language talk radio station in Mexico City owned by Grupo Imagen. XEDA is the flagship station of the Imagen Radio network which is available to other Mexican cities through Imagen's owned-and-operated stations and affiliates.

XEDA-FM broadcasts in HD.

History
In 1968, Publicistas, S.A., received the concession to sign on XEDA-FM 90.5 in Mexico City, and was later acquired by Grupo Imagen, who branded the station as "Radio Imagen" airing contemporary music. In 1992, it adopted a Top 40 format as "Pulsar FM". In 2000, it became a talk station, simply known as "Imagen 90.5" and soon forming a national network. It still retains some musical programming in the overnight hours.

Affiliates owned by Grupo Imagen
 XHKOK-FM 88.9 MHz - Acapulco, Guerrero
 XHQOO-FM 90.7 MHz - Cancún, Quintana Roo
 XHCHI-FM 97.3 MHz - Chihuahua, Chihuahua
 XHPCPG-FM 98.1 MHz - Chilpancingo de los Bravo, Guerrero
 XEDA-FM 90.5 MHz - México City
 XHCC-FM 89.3 MHz - Colima, Colima
 XHSC-FM 93.9 MHz - Guadalajara, Jalisco
 XHHLL-FM 90.7 MHz (HD2) - Hermosillo, Sonora
 XHOLA-FM 105.1 MHz - Puebla, Puebla
 XHCMS-FM 105.5 MHz - Mexicali, Baja California
 XHMN-FM 107.7 MHz - Monterrey, Nuevo León
 XHTLN-FM 94.1 MHz - Nuevo Laredo, Tamaulipas
 XHOZ-FM 94.7 MHz - Queretaro, Queretaro
 XHRP-FM 94.7 MHz - Saltillo, Coahuila
 XHEPO-FM 103.1 MHz - San Luis Potosi, San Lusi Potosi
 XHMIG-FM 105.9 MHz - San Miguel de Allende, Guanajuato
 XHMDR-FM 103.1 MHz - Tampico, Tamaulipas
 XHLTN-FM 104.5 MHz (HD2) - Tijuana, Baja California
 XHEN-FM  100.3 MHz - Torreón, Coahuila
 XHQRV-FM 92.5 MHz - Veracruz, Veracruz

References

External links
imagenradio.com.mx

Radio stations established in 1962
Radio stations in Mexico City
Grupo Imagen